WillowWood School is an alternative private school in Toronto, Ontario, Canada for Grades 1 through 12.  It was founded in 1980 by owner/principal Joy Kurtz.

The school caters for children with learning differences, ADHD, and other learning challenges.

WillowWood has an Arts and Sports program. There are two annual presentations: the Holiday Happening in December, and the Musical in the Spring. WillowWood sports teams participate in the SSAF (Small Schools Athletic Federation) as the WillowWood Warriors.

External links

  WillowWood School at OurKids.net

Special education in Canada
Educational institutions established in 1980
Private schools in Toronto